James Knox (born December 6, 1965 in San Francisco, California) is an American politician. Elected in 2010, he is a Republican member of the Montana Legislature.  He was elected to House District 47 which representsBillings and a portion of the Yellowstone County area.

In 2011, Knox spoke out in favor of repealing Montana's medical marijuana legislation.

References

Living people
Republican Party members of the Montana House of Representatives
1965 births